Heather May Klimchuk  (born August 10, 1958) is a Canadian politician who was a member of the Legislative Assembly of Alberta representing the constituency of Edmonton-Glenora as a Progressive Conservative, from 2008 to 2015. She was Minister of Human Services from 2014 until defeated in the 2015 provincial election.

Political career
Before  being elected in the 2008 Alberta General Election, Klimchuk also ran the 2001 and 2004 election campaigns of former Edmonton-Glenora MLA Drew Hutton.

She was narrowly elected as MLA for Edmonton-Glenora in the 2008 election over Alberta Liberal Party incumbent Bruce Miller by 96 votes, less than 1% of votes cast. In the 2011 PC leadership election Klimchuk supported Gary Mar, who was  defeated by Alison Redford. Klimchuk was re-elected by a more comfortable margin in the 2012 election and was named Minister of Human Services on September 15, 2014 in the first cabinet of Jim Prentice. She has previously served as Minister of Culture and Community Services and Minister of Service Alberta. Klimchuk was defeated in the 2015 Alberta general election as the Alberta NDP won every seat in Edmonton.

She was considered to be part of the progressive or Red Tory wing of the PC Party.

Personal life
Klimchuk has a long family history with the PC Party. Her father worked on Premier Peter Lougheed's first electoral campaign and was a classmate of Joe Clark's at law school. Her public service experience prior to serving as a Member of the Legislature includes working as a researcher and writer for both Premier Lougheed and Premier Don Getty.She also assisted with the initiation of the Alberta Seniors´ information phone line.

Klimchuk holds a bachelor of arts (special) from the University of Alberta in political science. She and her husband, Wade, have two children: Kyrsten and Keifer.

Election results

References 

1958 births
Living people
Businesspeople from Calgary
Businesspeople from Edmonton
Canadian real estate agents
Members of the Executive Council of Alberta
Politicians from Calgary
Politicians from Edmonton
Progressive Conservative Association of Alberta MLAs
University of Alberta alumni
Women government ministers of Canada
Women MLAs in Alberta
21st-century Canadian politicians
21st-century Canadian women politicians